Irina Yuryevna Leparskaya (born July 27, 1957 in Novorossiysk, Russian SSR, Soviet Union) is a rhythmic gymnastics trainer who is the Head coach of the Belarusian Rhythmic Gymnastics.

Career 
Irina was born in Novorossiysk, Krasnodar Krai, Russia. She graduated from the Belarusian State Order of the Red Banner Institute of Physical Education (1979). Since 1981, Leparskaya has worked as a coach in the sports club "Dynamo Minsk".

Leparskaya is an Honored Worker of Physical Culture of Belarus and Honoured Master of Sports of Belarus (since 1988).

Coaching history and notable students 
Leparskaya has trained many Belarusian Olympic/World/European/World Cup medalists notably:

 Marina Lobatch (born in 1970) - the 1988 all-around Olympic champion and the first Soviet/only Belarusian to win the Olympic Games in rhythmic gymnastics.
 Yulia Raskina (born in 1982) - the 2000 Olympic all-around silver medalist, 1999 World silver medalist and two-time (1999, 2000) European all-around silver medalist.
 Inna Zhukova (born in 1986) - the 2008 Olympic all-around silver medalist and 2006 Grand Prix Final bronze medalist.
 Liubov Charkashyna (born in 1987) - the 2012 Olympics all-around bronze medalist, two-time World Cup Final all-around bronze medalist, 2011 European ball and clubs gold medalist.
 Melitina Staniouta (born in 1993) - three-time (2015, 2013, 2010) World all-around bronze medalist and three time World Cup Final all-around medalist.
 Alina Tumilovich - two-time Olympic Group medalist (bronze in 2008 and silver in 2012).
 Ksenia Sankovich - two-time Olympic Group medalist (bronze in 2008 and silver in 2012).
 Aliaksandra Narkevich - Olympic and World Group medalist
 Larissa Lukyanenko (born in 1973) - three-time (1992, 1994, 1995) World all-around medalist and 1993 European all-around silver medalist.
 Tatiana Ogrizko (born in 1976) - the 1997 European all-around silver medalist and 1996 Grand Prix Final all-around bronze medalist.
 Katsiaryna Halkina (born in 1997) - the 2018 European all-around bronze medalist
 Evgenia Pavlina (born in 1978) - the 1998 European all-around silver medalist, 1998 European ribbon champion
 Valeria Vatkina (born in 1981) - 1997 Grand Prix Final all-around silver medalist and two-time World team silver medalist.
 Olga Gontar (born in 1979) - 1995 Grand Prix Final all-around bronze medalist.
 Elena Tkachenko (born in 1983) - multiple World / European medalist.
 Elena Bolotina (born in 1997) - 2015 Grand Prix Final all-around bronze medalist.
 Maria Kadobina - World Group bronze medalist
 Arina Charopa (born in 1995) - the 2010 Youth Olympic Games silver medalist
 Hanna Bazhko - World Team medalist
 Svetlana Rudalova (born in 1984) - World Team medalist
 Alina Harnasko - 2020+1 Olympic individual all-around bronze medalist, 2020 European all-around silver medalist.
Anastasiia Salos - 2020 European all-around bronce medalist.
 Mariya Trubach - 2014 Youth Olympic Games all-around silver medalist

References

External links
 

Living people
Gymnastics coaches
Belarusian rhythmic gymnasts
1957 births